Gjeble Pederssøn (c.1490 – 9 March 1557) was a Norwegian priest who was the first Lutheran bishop in Norway. 

Pederssøn was born at Teigstad, Dønna in Nordland, Norway. His father was a councilman in Bergen. He went to school in Trondheim and was later a student at Bergen Cathedral School. Later he traveled to the Netherlands and studied in the city of Alkmaar. He also studied at the University of Leuven during the period 1513 and 1514. After a few years of education abroad he took his magister degree. He returned to work at a school in Bergen. In 1518 he became canon and priest at St Mary's Church in Bergen.

In 1536, he was elected the bishop at Bergen, but the appointment came as the Protestant Reformation was also arriving in Norway. He thus became 
the first Lutheran bishop in Norway, serving as bishop in Bergen stift from 1536 (ordinated in 1537) until his death in 1557. He devoted much of his time as bishop in his efforts to initiate reform of the church. In this regard, he found an ally in Hans Gaas (1500–1578), bishop of the Diocese of Nidaros, who was also active in the reform process. Gjeble also  helped young, gifted men with education, principally for the priesthood.  Among the students whose education he sponsored was Absalon Pederssøn Beyer (1528–1575) who was appointed lecturer in theology at Bergen Cathedral School.

References

1490 births
1557 deaths
People from Dønna
People educated at the Bergen Cathedral School
Old University of Leuven alumni
16th-century Norwegian Lutheran clergy
Bishops of Bjørgvin